Sefid Zangul (also Romanized as Sefīd Zangūl and Safīd Zangūl; also known as Sefīd Jāngur) is a village in Agahan Rural District, Kolyai District, Sonqor County, Kermanshah Province, Iran. At the 2006 census, its population was 75, in 16 families.

References 

Populated places in Sonqor County